Robin Anderson was the defending champion but chose to participate at the 2022 Ilkley Trophy instead.

Marina Bassols Ribera won the title, defeating Alex Eala in the final, 6–4, 7–5.

Seeds
All seeds receive a bye into the second round.

Draw

Finals

Top half

Section 1

Section 2

Bottom half

Section 3

Section 4

References

External links
Draws

Open ITF Arcadis Brezo Osuna - Singles